In plant science, the spermosphere is the zone in the soil surrounding a germinating seed. This is a small volume with radius perhaps 1 cm but varying with seed type, the variety of soil microorganisms, the level of soil moisture, and other factors. Within the spermosphere a range of complex interactions take place among the germinating seed, the soil, and the microbiome. Because germination is a brief process, the spermosphere is transient, but the impact of the microbial activity within the spermosphere can have strong and long-lasting effects on the developing plant.

Seeds exude various molecules that influence their surrounding microbial communities, either inhibiting or stimulating their growth. The composition of the exudates varies according to the plant type and such properties of the soil as its pH and moisture content. With these biochemical effects, the spermosphere develops both downward—to form the rhizosphere (upon the emergence of the plant's radicle)—and upward to form the laimosphere, which is the soil surrounding the growing plant stem.

References

Soil biology
Plant roots
Environmental soil science